Babita Shivdasani-Kapoor (born 20 April 1947), also known simply as Babita or Babita Kapoor, is an Indian former actress who appeared in Hindi-language films. The daughter of actor Hari Shivdasani, she is the first cousin of her contemporary actress Sadhana Shivdasani. Her debut film was the successful drama Dus Lakh (1966), but it was the romantic thriller Raaz (1967), opposite Rajesh Khanna, that gained her recognition. From 1966 to 1973, she starred in nineteen films as the lead heroine, including the box office successes Dus Lakh (1966), Farz (1967), Haseena Maan Jayegi, Kismat (both in 1968), Ek Shriman Ek Shrimati (1969), Doli (1969), Kab? Kyoon? Aur Kahan? (1970), Kal Aaj Aur Kal (1971) and Banphool (1971). Following her marriage to actor Randhir Kapoor in 1971, she acted in Jeet and Ek Hasina Do Diwane (both in 1972). Her subsequent release, Sone Ke Hath (1973) flopped and she decided to leave her film career. The couple has two daughters together, film actresses Karishma and Kareena.

Background
Babita was born in Karachi to actor Hari Shivdasani, who was from a Sindhi Hindu family (settled in Bombay prior to and after the partition of India) and a British Christian mother, Barbara Shivdasani. Her sister, Meena Advani, was her costume designer in the 60s and was instrumental in making her a fashion icon. After marriage, her sister is now the owner of Powermaster Engineers Private Limited and Power-master tools Private Limited. The iconic actress Sadhana Shivdasani was her paternal cousin and contemporary.

Career
In her movie career, she appeared in nineteen films. Her first film to release was the 1966 successful film Dus Lakh, which also starred Sanjay Khan, Om Prakash and her sister-in-law to be Neetu Singh. However, the first film she had signed was actually Raaz (1967) co-starring Rajesh Khanna, which was released in 1967. Her biggest box office successes were Dus Lakh with Sanjay Khan, Ek Shrimaan Ek Shrimati and  Haseena Maan Jayegi (1968), (with her future uncle-in-law) Shashi Kapoor, Farz, Banphool and Ek Hasina Do Diwane with Jeetendra, Doli with Rajesh Khanna, Tumse Achha Kaun Hai (1969) with her future uncle in law Shammi Kapoor, Kismat with Biswajeet, Kab? Kyoon? Aur Kahan? (1970) with Dharmendra and Pehchaan with Manoj Kumar. In 1971, she acted opposite her future husband Randhir Kapoor, as well as father in-law Raj Kapoor and grandfather-in-law Prithviraj Kapoor in Kal Aaj Aur Kal. After her marriage to Randhir, they were cast together by director K. Shankar in Jeet, which was the remake of En Annan, starring M. G. Ramachandran and Jayalalithaa. She left the film industry in 1973 following her husband's family tradition.

Personal life
Babita fell in love with Randhir Kapoor, while working with him in the film Kal Aaj Aur Kal (1971). They married in a lavish ceremony on 6 November 1971. They have two children, actresses Karisma Kapoor and Kareena Kapoor. In the 1980s, Randhir's career as an actor started to decline and things soured between them. She and Randhir lived in separate homes for several years, even though they were still legally married and had no intention of divorcing. The couple reunited in 2007 after living separately for several years.

Filmography

References

External links

 

Living people
Indian film actresses
Indian people of English descent
Sindhi people
Kapoor family
1947 births
Actresses from Mumbai
Actresses of European descent in Indian films
20th-century Indian actresses